Federal elections were held in Switzerland on 25 October 1925. The Free Democratic Party remained the largest party in the National Council, winning 60 of the 198 seats.

Results

National Council

By constituencies

Council of States
In several cantons the members of the Council of States were chosen by the cantonal parliaments.

By canton

References

Switzerland
1925 in Switzerland
Federal elections in Switzerland
October 1925 events
Federal